Malcolm Grant may refer to:

Malcolm Grant (born 1947), New Zealand-born British academic in law, Provost and President of University College London
Malcolm Grant (East India Company officer) (1762–1831), English army officer in Bombay
Malcolm Grant (priest) (born 1944), British Anglican priest, Provost of St Mary's Cathedral, Glasgow and then St Andrew's Cathedral, Inverness
Malcolm Grant (basketball) (born 1988), American professional basketball player